Coral rag is a rubbly limestone composed of ancient coral reef material. The term also refers to the building blocks quarried from these strata, which are an important local building material in areas such as the coast of East Africa and the southeastern United States littoral (e.g. Florida, Bermuda).

It is also the name of a member—the Coral Rag Member—of the Upper Oxfordian Coralline Oolite Formation of North Yorkshire. "Calne Freestone And Coral Rag" is a former name for the Stanford Formation, which stretches from Westbury in Wiltshire to Waddesdon in Buckinghamshire.

Varieties
Corallian Limestone
Keystone (limestone)

See also

Coral Rag Formation
Coral sand
List of types of limestone

Notes

Limestone
Coral reefs